Dancing in Silks (foaled March 2, 2005 in California) is an American Thoroughbred racehorse best known for winning the 2009 Breeders' Cup Sprint at Santa Anita Park.

A 4-year-old gelding, Dancing in Silks was bred by Ronald E. Jex. The horse races for Ken Kinakin and is trained by Carla Gaines. Dancing in Silks is the only horse owned by Ken Kinakin, a 48-year-old Canadian businessman from Kelowna, British Columbia. Originally sold at the November 2005 Keeneland Breeding Stock Sale for $20,000, Kinakin purchased him at the 2006 Canadian Thoroughbred Horse Society (British Columbia Division) Summer Mixed Sale for $21,401.

The winner of the Breeders' Cup Sprint in a four-horse blanket finish, the race marked the fourth straight win for Dancing in Silks and his first try in a Grade One event.

Dancing in Silks shared 2009 California Horse of the Year honors with California Flag. He continues to train at Santa Anita Park and is expected to make his next start there in January 2010.

References
 Dancing in Silks' pedigree and partial racing stats
 Profile of Dancing in Silks at Bloodhorse.com
 Dancing in Silks at Breeders' Cup.com with video of the 2009 Sprint

2005 racehorse births
Thoroughbred family 14-b
Racehorses bred in California
Racehorses trained in the United States
Breeders' Cup Sprint winners